DJ Speedy, also known as Harvey Miller or "Gangsta Nerd"  is a music producer. 

Originally from Orangeburg, SC, DJ Speedy resides in Atlanta, GA.

Music career
Miller acted as a mix show DJ in South Carolina. He moved to Atlanta, Georgia where he founded his own production company, Speedy Productions with his cousin.

His songs as a rapper have included parody commercials of AT&T to Fourlokos, as well as singles such as "You're a Star" featuring Shawty Redd.

DJ Speedy has partnered with the Global Good Group to become a part of the Global Good Network of people, businesses, organizations, musicians, and more dedicated to changing the world.

In 2019, Miller was held in Oklahoma after being pulled over on suspicion of drug trafficking. $149,665 in cash was seized, although no drugs were found. He was charged for having a single counterfeit $20 bill.

Club appearances
Throw Backs 2009
Club Libra 2009
Strokers Night Club
Club Miami 2009/2010
Wild Bills 2009
Three Bears Cafe 2009
Apache Cafe 2009
Club Crucial 2010
The Five Spot 2010
Eat Andrews Cafe & Bar 2010
Mint Lounge 2010
Atlanta Live 2010

Discography

 Waka Flocka Album (Triple F Life)

Get Low  ft/ Nick Manji Flo Rida and Tyga

Triple F Life (Outro)

References

External links
 DJ Speedy 

1976 births
Living people
American hip hop record producers